Coila may refer to:

Coila (muse), associated with Robert Burns

Geography
Coila (Arcadia), a town of ancient Arcadia, Greece
Coila, Mississippi, a community in the United States
Coila Creek, a stream in Mississippi
Kyle, Ayrshire, Scotland